Parry Sound (Portage Lake) Water Aerodrome  is located  north of Parry Sound, Ontario Canada.

See also
 List of airports in the Parry Sound area

References

Registered aerodromes in Parry Sound District
Seaplane bases in Ontario